66 Aurigae is a single star located approximately 880 light years away from the Sun in the northern constellation of Auriga. It is visible to the naked eye as a faint, orange hued star with an apparent magnitude of 5.23. This object is moving further from the Earth with a heliocentric radial velocity of +22.6 km/s.

At the age of 107 million years, 66 Aurigae is an evolved giant star, most likely (98% chance) on the horizontal branch, with a stellar classification of K0.5 IIIa. Keenan and Yorka (1987) identified it as a strong–CN star, showing an excess strength of the blue CN bands in the spectrum. Having exhausted the supply of hydrogen at its core, the star has expanded to 48 times the Sun's radius. 66 Aurigae has five times the mass of the Sun and is radiating 834 times the Sun's luminosity from its swollen photosphere at an effective temperature of 4,475 K.

References

External links
 HR 2805
 Image 66 Aurigae

K-type main-sequence stars
CN stars
Horizontal-branch stars
Auriga (constellation)
Durchmusterung objects
Aurigae, 66
157669
035907
2805